Hannah McKay may refer to :

 Hannah McKay, fictional character.
 Hannah McKay, Reuters photojournalist, winner of Pulitzer Prize, feature photography.